Nancy Roberts is an American motion picture and television producer and writer who is the managing partner of Stampede Entertainment.  She was previously a talent agent and later a talent manager who ran her own company called The Roberts Company.

Filmography

References

American television producers
American women television producers
Living people
Place of birth missing (living people)
Year of birth missing (living people)
American television writers
American women television writers
21st-century American women